The 1912 United States presidential election in Kentucky took place on November 5, 1912, as part of the 1912 United States presidential election. Kentucky voters chose 13 representatives, or electors, to the Electoral College, who voted for president and vice president.

Kentucky was won by Princeton University President Woodrow Wilson (D–Virginia), running with governor of Indiana Thomas R. Marshall, with 48.48% of the popular vote, against the 27th president of the United States William Howard Taft (R–Ohio), running with Columbia University President Nicholas Murray Butler, with 25.52% of the popular vote and the 26th president of the United States Theodore Roosevelt (P–New York), running with governor of California Hiram Johnson, with 22.48% of the popular vote. , this is the last election in which Pulaski County, Laurel County, Allen County, Casey County, and Edmonson County voted for the Democratic candidate and the last in which McCreary County and Jackson County did not support the Republican candidate.

Results

Results by county

Notes

References

Kentucky
1912
1912 Kentucky elections